Nissim or Nisim may refer to:

People

Given name

Nissim (rapper) (born 1986), American Jewish rapper
Nissim of Gerona (1320–1376), talmudist and authority on Jewish law
Nisim Aloni (1926–1998), Israeli playwright and translator
Nissim Behar (1848–1931), Jewish Palestinian educator
Nissim ben Jacob (990–1062),  also known as Rav Nissim Gaon, a rabbi
Nissim Dahan (born 1954), Israeli politician who served as Minister of Health 
Nissim de Camondo (1892–1917), French banker
Nissim Eliad (1919–2014), Israeli politician
Nissim Ezekiel (1924–2004), Indian Jewish poet, playwright, editor, and art critic
Nissim Karelitz (born 1926), rabbi
Nissim Mossek (born 1948), Israeli documentary director, writer, and producer
Nissim Ze'ev (born 1951), Israeli politician
Nissim Zvili (born 1942), Israeli politician

Surname

Afik Nissim (born 1981), Israeli point guard in basketball
Chaïm Nissim (1949–2017), Green politician who launched the 1982 rocket attack against the Superphénix nuclear plant
Eliahu Nissim (born 1933), Israeli Professor in Aeronautical Engineering; President of the Open University of Israel
Gabriele Nissim (born 1950), Italian journalist, historian, and essayist 
 (1908–1976), Italian civilian anti-fascist hero
Jacob ben Nissim ibn Shahin, Jewish philosopher who lived in Tunisia in the 10th century
Jared Nissim
Judah ben Nissim al-Malkah, Moroccan, Jewish writer and philosopher 
Moshe Nissim (born 1935), Israeli politician and Deputy Prime Minister 
Offer Nissim, Israeli musician
Oren Nissim (born 1976), Israeli footballer
Yitzhak Nissim (1896–1981), Sephardic chief rabbi of Israel 
Solomon Nissim Algazi (1610–1683), rabbi in the 17th century

Museums
Musée Nissim de Camondo, museum

Synagogues
Bet Nissim Synagogue, synagogue built in the 1840s in Istanbul, Turkey